The 1927 All-Missouri Valley Conference football team consists of American football players chosen by various organizations for All-Missouri Valley Conference teams for the 1927 college football season.  The selectors for the 1927 season included the Associated Press (AP).

All-Missouri Valley selections

Ends
 Roy LeCrone, Oklahoma (AP-1)
 Miller Brown, Missouri (AP-1)
 Harold Hauser, Kansas (AP-2)
 Ted Fleck, Kansas State (AP-2)

Tackles
 Ray Randels, Nebraska (AP-1)
 Norris, Oklahoma (AP-1)
 William W. Smith, Missouri (AP-2)
 Francis E. Lucas, Missouri (AP-2)

Guards
 Danny McMullen, Nebraska (AP-1)
 Robert N. Miller, Missouri (AP-1)
 Bob Fischer, Iowa State (AP-2)
 Elmer Holm, Nebraska (AP-2)

Centers
 Gould Ayres, Iowa State (AP-1)
 Theodore James, Nebraska (AP-2)

Quarterbacks
 Wales, Iowa State (AP-1)
 A. Lynwood Haskins, Oklahoma (AP-2)

Halfbacks
 Robert Mehrle, Missouri (AP-1)
 Glenn Presnell, Nebraska (AP-1)
 Harry Lindblom, Iowa State (AP-2)
 Joe Holsinger, Kansas State (AP-2)

Fullbacks
 Blue Howell, Nebraska (AP-1)
 John Miller, Iowa State (AP-2)

Key
AP = Associated Press

See also
 1927 College Football All-America Team

References

All-Missouri Valley Conference football team
All-Big Eight Conference football teams